Hulabila (Lit: Hullabaloo) is Bengali band Chandrabindoo's 7th studio album . It was released in 2005 by Sagarika.

Track list
 Hote Pare Cliche (Lyrics: Chandril / Music: Upal, Surajit)
 Kete Jaye Din (Lyrics: Anindya / Music: Upal)
 Timepass (Lyrics: Anindya / Music: Surajit)
 Thak Barong (Lyrics: Chandril / Music: Surajit)
 Tai Tomar Ananda (Lyrics: Chandril / Music: Upal, Surajit)
 Ghumiye Poro Na (Lyrics & Music: Anindya)
 Hulabila (Lyrics: Chandril, Anindya / Music: Surajit)
 Pashbalish (Lyrics & Music: Anindya)
 Ami to Bhege Jai (Lyrics & Music: Anindya)# Aamra Bangali Jati (Lyrics & Music: Chandril)

Tracks like "Pashbalish" and "Aamra Bangali Jati" have the quirky spirit that Chandrabindoo is well known for. 
"Thak Barong" is another track, where we could see the lyrical mastery of Chandril along with sublime singing of Upal.

Though, they have a minor resurgence with U/A in 2007, their commercial success started declining with this album.

Notes

2005 albums
Chandrabindoo (band) albums